Giovanni Marco Pitteri  (1703–1767) was an Italian engraver of the late Baroque period in his native Venice.
He engraved densely incised portraits with shading of almost photographic quality. He is said to have trained under Giovanni Antonio Faldoni, and to have engraved in the style of Mellan. He engraved a drawing of Saint Philip by Piazzetta, in whose studio he worked. He had as one of his pupils Giovanni Domenico Lorenzi.

Gallery

References

1703 births
1767 deaths
Republic of Venice artists
Italian engravers
Catholic engravers